The highway system of Hamilton County, New York, comprises  of roads maintained by the New York State Department of Transportation (NYSDOT), the county, and its towns and villages. NYSDOT maintains five state touring routes in Hamilton County, which account for a combined  of New York's state highway mileage. These five routes are supplemented by Hamilton County's county route system, which comprises 25 roads of varying length and importance. The  system, maintained by the Hamilton County Department of Public Works, connects the state routes to a number of small hamlets and other points of interest.

Hamilton County's five state routes are spread throughout the county, which is the least populated in the state of New York. The routes are NY 8, NY 10, NY 28, NY 28N, and NY 30. The five state highways traverse highly rural sections of Adirondack Park; in fact, the only village along any of these roads is Speculator, located at the western junction of NY 8 and NY 30. NY 10 and NY 28 were assigned in 1924, while the others were assigned in 1930. NY 365 once passed through the county; however, it was truncated southwestward to end in Oneida County in the late 1950s. Additionally, NY 10 extended north along modern NY 30 to the Canada–US border until , when it was replaced with NY 30 north of Speculator. Since the truncation of NY 10, there have not been any substantial changes to roads in Hamilton County.

NY 8 

It stretches from Deposit in the Southern Tier to an intersection with NY 9N in Hague on the shores of Lake George. Along the way, NY 8 intersects the northern terminus of NY 10 in Arietta. The route is also one of two state routes to pass through the isolated village of Speculator; the other being NY 30. NY 8 was assigned as part of the 1930 renumbering of state highways in New York and has not been changed within Hamilton County since that time.

Major intersections

NY 10 

NY 10 is the shortest state route that traverses Hamilton County. NY 10 travels from the Fulton County line north of Caroga Lake to Arietta, where it ends at NY 8. The route passes through rural regions of Hamilton County and encounters no villages or noteworthy locations until Arietta. When NY 10 was first assigned in 1924, it entered the county from the east on modern NY 28N and left to the north on current NY 30. In the 1930 renumbering, NY 10 was realigned south of Long Lake to follow what is now NY 30 and NY 8 south to Arietta, from where it continued south to Fulton County on its modern routing. The resulting overlap with NY 8 was eliminated  after NY 10 was replaced with an extended NY 30 north of Speculator.

Major intersections

NY 28 

Heading away from the western county line, NY 28 follows the Fulton Chain Lakes, which are numbered consecutively as the route and lakes continue northward. At Blue Mountain Lake, NY 28 and NY 30 become concurrent at an intersection that also serves as the western terminus of NY 28N, a suffixed route of NY 28. From here, NY 28 and NY 30 head to the southeast for over  into Indian Lake, where NY 30 breaks from the route and heads southward. NY 28 was assigned in 1924, but was not extended into Hamilton County until the 1930 renumbering. Its number has remained unchanged within Hamilton County since that time.

Major intersections

NY 28N 

NY 28N, a suffixed route of NY 28, is the only state route that begins in the county itself. Only  of its length is in Hamilton County, roughly 40 percent of the route's  total across three counties. The route begins at an intersection with NY 28 and NY 30 at Blue Mountain Lake. Concurrent with the latter highway, NY 28N heads northward through mountainous parts of Hamilton County to Long Lake, where NY 30 splits and heads in the direction of Franklin County. From here, NY 28N heads eastward, passing some mountains before entering Essex County and continuing into Newcomb.

NY 28N was assigned as a suffixed route of the extended NY 28 in the 1930 renumbering. The concurrency that runs from Blue Mountain Lake to Long Lake was originally part of NY 10, which used to occupy all of modern NY 30 north of Speculator. When NY 10 was truncated , the highway became concurrent with NY 30 instead.

Major intersections

NY 30 

NY 30 stretches for  within the county, making it the longest state highway in Hamilton County. NY 30 is one of two highways that enters a village in Hamilton County, the other being NY 8. The route overlaps three other state routes in Hamilton County: NY 8 near Speculator, NY 28 from Indian Lake to Blue Mountain Lake, and NY 28N from Blue Mountain Lake to Long Lake. NY 30 stretches from the Fulton County line north of Mayfield to the Franklin County line north of Long Lake and NY 28N.

Initially, NY 30 was not the longest state highway in Hamilton County. When it was assigned in the 1930 renumbering, NY 30 followed its current routing to Wells, where it terminated at NY 8. The remainder of modern NY 30 was part of NY 8 from Wells to Speculator and part of NY 10 from Speculator to the Canada–US border. Ca. 1960, NY 10 was truncated south to Arietta, and NY 30 was extended northward to the Canada–US border by way of NY 8 and NY 10's former routing.

Major intersections

Former routes
Four other state routes once entered Hamilton County, but no longer do. Two of these routes—NY 80 and NY 365—were simply truncated out of the county, while two others—NY 10A and NY 54—no longer exist.

NY 10A

NY 10A was a southerly alternate route of then-NY 10 between Long Lake and North Creek, Warren County, via Blue Mountain Lake. While NY 10 followed modern NY 28N between the two locations, NY 10A utilized what is now NY 30 and NY 28. It was assigned in the late 1920s and replaced by a realigned NY 10 and an extended NY 28 in the 1930 renumbering of state highways in New York.

NY 54

NY 54 was a circuitous east–west route that extended from Utica, Oneida County, to Fonda, Montgomery County, via Speculator and Benson. It entered Hamilton County from Herkimer County on modern NY 8 and proceeded east through Speculator to Wells, where it turned south to follow what is now NY 30 to the Fulton County line. It was assigned in the mid-1920s and split into several routes, including NY 8 and NY 30, in the 1930 renumbering.

NY 80

NY 80 originally continued much farther north than it does today. When it was assigned in the late 1920s, it continued north from Fort Plain, Montgomery County, to NY 54 in Arietta by way of modern NY 10. The Arietta – Fort Plain portion of NY 80 was replaced by a realigned NY 10 as part of the 1930 renumbering.

NY 365

NY 365 is the only post-1930 state route that once entered Hamilton County, but no longer does. When it was assigned , the route entered Hamilton County from Herkimer County, overlapping with NY 28 until Blue Mountain Lake. Here, it turned off NY 28 and onto NY 10 (later NY 30) and NY 28N. The three routes overlapped to Long Lake, where NY 28N split off from both NY 10 and NY 365. The two highways continued northward, leaving Hamilton County and passing into Franklin County north of Long Lake. NY 365 was truncated in the late 1950s to end near the Oneida County village of Holland Patent, eliminating a series of overlaps between NY 365 and other state routes that collectively extended from Holland Patent to Plattsburgh, Clinton County.

County routes 
The Hamilton County Department of Public Works maintains a system of 25 county-designated highways, which make up almost  of the county's highway system. The highest numbered route is CR 25, located in Hope, and the lowest numbered one is CR 1, which is located in Inlet. Most of the county routes serve as connectors to state routes or other county routes. Several end suddenly and become local roads, and some cross the county line and become another county route. Hamilton County's 25-route system is the smallest system of signed county routes in the state of New York. The closest one after is Tioga County, located in the Southern Tier of New York. Route numbers, lengths, and termini are derived from the 2010 NYSDOT Hamilton County inventory unless otherwise noted.

See also 

County routes in New York

References 

Hamilton County
Transportation in Hamilton County, New York